Philipp Gallhuber (born 27 June 1995) is an Austrian retired professional footballer who played as a right back and current youth coach at Austria Wien.

References

External links 

Living people
1995 births
Austrian footballers
2. Liga (Austria) players
FC Admira Wacker Mödling players
Wiener Sport-Club players
SKU Amstetten players
Association football defenders